CW Leonis or IRC +10216 is a carbon star that is embedded in a thick dust envelope. It was first discovered in 1969 by a group of astronomers led by Eric Becklin, based upon infrared observations made with the  Caltech Infrared Telescope at Mount Wilson Observatory. Its energy is emitted mostly at infrared wavelengths. At a wavelength of 5 μm, it was found to have the highest flux of any object outside the Solar System.

Properties

CW Leonis is believed to be in a late stage of its life, blowing off its own sooty atmosphere to form a white dwarf. Based upon isotope ratios of magnesium, the initial mass of this star has been constrained to lie between 3–5 solar masses. The mass of the star's core, and the final mass of the star once it becomes a white dwarf, is about 0.7–0.9 solar masses. Its bolometric luminosity varies over the course of a 649-day pulsation cycle, ranging from a minimum of about 6,250 times the Sun's luminosity up to a peak of around 15,800 times.

The carbon-rich gaseous envelope surrounding this star is at least 69,000 years old and the star is losing about solar masses per year. The extended envelope contains at least 1.4 solar masses of material. Speckle observations from 1999 show a complex structure to this dust envelope, including partial arcs and unfinished shells. This clumpiness may be caused by a magnetic cycle in the star that is comparable to the solar cycle in the Sun and results in periodic increases in mass loss.

Various chemical elements and about 50 molecules have been detected in the outflows from CW Leonis, among others nitrogen, oxygen and water, silicon and iron. One theory was that the star was once surrounded by comets which melted once the star started expanding, but water is now thought to form naturally in the atmospheres of all carbon stars.

Distance

If the distance to this star is assumed to be at the lower end of the estimate range, 120 pc, then the astrosphere surrounding the star spans a radius of about 84,000 AU. The star and its surrounding envelope are advancing at a velocity of more than 91 km/s through the surrounding interstellar medium. It is moving with a space velocity of [U, V, W] = [, ] km s−1.

Companion
Several papers have suggested that CW Leonis has a close binary companion. ALMA and astrometric measurements may show orbital motion. The astrometric measurements, combined with a model including the companion, provide a parallax measurement showing that CW Leonis is the closest carbon star to the Earth.

See also
List of largest stars
List of most luminous stars

References

External links 
Water Found Around Nearby Star CW Leonis Astronomy Picture of the Day July 16th, 2001
Variations in the dust envelope around IRC +10216 revealed by aperture masking interferometry
 http://jumk.de/astronomie/special-stars/cw-leonis.shtml
 

Carbon stars
Protoplanetary nebulae
Leo (constellation)
?
Mira variables
Objects with variable star designations
IRAS catalogue objects
J09475740+1316435
Emission-line stars